George William Cook (27 February 1895 – 31 December 1980), sometimes known as Billy Cook, was an English professional footballer, best remembered for his spells as an inside left in the Football League with Huddersfield Town and Aston Villa.

Career

Early years 
Cook began his career with spells as a youth at Evenwood Juniors and Trindle Juniors and played for the Royal Artillery during the First World War. He joined Northern League club Bishop Auckland in 1919 and won the FA Amateur Cup in 1920–21 and 1921–22. A move to Second Division club Rotherham County followed in 1922.

Huddersfield Town 
Cook joined First Division club Huddersfield Town in 1923. He was a part of the most successful period in the club's history, winning the First Division championship in the 1923–24, 1924–25 and 1925–26 seasons. He scored 35 goals in 91 appearances before departing the Terriers in February 1927.

Aston Villa 
Cook signed for First Division club Aston Villa in February 1927. While he failed to win any silverware, Cook was in prolific goalscoring form, scoring 40 goals in 61 matches before departing at the end of the 1928–29 season.

Tottenham Hotspur 
Cook dropped down to join Second Division club Tottenham Hotspur during the 1929 off-season. Now aged 34, he scored 30 goals in 73 appearances before his release in April 1931.

Brentford 
Cook moved across London to sign for Third Division South club Brentford during the 1931 off-season. He began his time at Griffin Park well, scoring on his second appearance in a 1–1 draw with Thames. In a mediocre season for the club, he failed to find the net again until 30 April 1932, when he scored two goals in a 4–2 win over Bournemouth & Boscombe Athletic. With the arrival of forwards Jack Holliday and Billy Scott, Cook departed Brentford at the end of the 1931–32 season.

Colwyn Bay United 
Cook ended his career in non-League football with spells at Birmingham & District League clubs Colwyn Bay United and Rhyl.

Honours 
Bishop Auckland
 FA Amateur Cup (1): 1920–21, 1921–22
Huddersfield Town
 Football League First Division (3): 1923–24, 1924–25, 1925–26

Career statistics

References

1895 births
1980 deaths
Footballers from County Durham
English footballers
Association football inside forwards
Bishop Auckland F.C. players
Rotherham County F.C. players
Huddersfield Town A.F.C. players
Aston Villa F.C. players
Tottenham Hotspur F.C. players
Brentford F.C. players
Colwyn Bay F.C. players
Northern Football League players
English Football League players
Rhyl F.C. players
British Army personnel of World War I
Royal Artillery personnel
Military personnel from County Durham